Danny Pardo (born 15 November 1971) is an Argentinian-born movie, TV, and voiceover actor living in Los Angeles. He became an international star in 2015 with his role as Padre Martin in the Argentinian-produced telenovela Entre Canibales (Among Cannibals).

Pardo is perhaps best known in the US for his roles in Planes: Fire & Rescue (2014), Prison Break (2007), and The Shield (2002).

Biography

Pardo was born in Buenos Aires, Argentina, South America, and he can trace his family roots back to Italy, Spain, and Yugoslavia. He received degrees in marketing and business in Argentina before moving to Miami, Florida, United States, in January 2001 to run an import business. In September 2003, he switched to acting, and booked his first commercial, for the Florida lottery, one month later.

After building a strong base in Miami in commercials and as a host on E! Entertainment Latin America's Vidas Bonitas and a reporter for Univision, Pardo moved to Los Angeles in 2005, where his career took off. He landed recurring roles on the hit TV shows Prison Break, 24, and The Shield, as well as the movies Pretty Obsession (2012) and Counterpunch (2014). He speaks Spanish, English, Portuguese, and Italian fluently, and has performed in all of these languages.
 
Pardo's breakthrough role came in February 2015, when he was cast by Juan Jose Campanella, director of the Oscar winner The Secret in Their Eyes (2010), to play Padre Martin in the hit Argentinian telenovela Entre Canibales. The popularity of the series has made him a star in his native Argentina and throughout South America.

Pardo and Campanella got the chance to work together again when Pardo guest-starred in an episode of the TV show Colony (2017).

Pardo has also done voiceover work for movies, TV, and video games, including The Cleveland Show, Call of Duty: Black Ops II, and Grand Theft Auto V. In 2014, he voiced the character Blackout in Disney's Planes: Fire & Rescue.

Filmography

Film

Television

Videogames

References

External links 

Living people
Argentine male actors
1971 births
People from Buenos Aires